Coca-Cola Cherry (originally marketed and still commonly referred to as Cherry Coke) is a cherry-flavored version of Coca-Cola. It is produced and distributed by The Coca-Cola Company and its bottlers in the United States and some international markets.

History
Long before its official introduction in stores in 1985, many diners, movie theaters and drugstore soda fountains dispensed an unofficial version by adding cherry-flavored syrup to Coca-Cola. 

The Coca-Cola Company first began testing its official Cherry flavored version of Coke along with other flavors on audiences visiting the 1982 World's Fair in Knoxville, Tennessee. Cherry Coke then entered mainstream production in the U.S. during the summer of 1985. Cherry Coke, which by 2007 had been renamed Coca-Cola Cherry in the U.S. and some other countries, was the third variation of Coca-Cola at that time – the others being regular Coca-Cola and Diet Coke – and the first flavored Coke. It was released nationally around the same time as the controversial reformulation of Coca-Cola, and gained significant market share when that product was widely (but not entirely) discontinued in the early 1990s. Diet Cherry Coke was introduced in 1986, and renamed "Diet Coke Cherry" in 2005 and again to "Diet Coke Feisty Cherry" in 2018. A second low-calorie version, Coca-Cola Cherry Zero (based on Coca-Cola Zero), was added in 2007. The Coca-Cola Company later introduced other flavored Coke variants, beginning with Vanilla Coke in May 2002, later followed by lime, raspberry, lemon, Black Cherry Vanilla and orange variants. Many of these are currently only sold in overseas markets and/or are microdispensed through Coca-Cola's Freestyle vending machines.

International distribution

Coca-Cola Cherry has been distributed in a number of different countries. Currently, in addition to the U.S., the drink is available in Sweden, Albania, China, Ukraine, United Kingdom, Republic of Ireland, Finland, Germany, Belgium (only in cans and 1-litre bottles), Denmark, France, Hungary, the Czech Republic, the Netherlands, Poland, Slovakia, Croatia, Latvia, Lithuania, South Africa, South Korea, Bulgaria, Greece (only in cans), Romania and Peru. It is also available in Japan, where it is still known as Cherry Coke. Until recently it was available in Ireland only through British pharmaceutical chains such as Boots and Superdrug; however, it returned officially to the country in 2014. In New Zealand, Coca-Cola Cherry can be found in some supermarkets (usually imported from the UK or US). In the past, the product has been distributed in Argentina, Brazil, Chile, Costa Rica, Colombia, Russia, Spain, Ukraine, Australia, New Zealand, the Philippines, and Israel. The Australian version was released between 2003 and 2004 and was a different formula to the US version. It is no longer bottled in these countries, although the U.S. product is imported by some Canadian convenience stores near the Canada–US border, as well as by IGA, Costco and specialty retailers in Australia. It was reintroduced in all Canadian grocery stores in 2016. In Sweden it is available at different grocery stores. The grocery stores source import from the United States and the self-produced Coca-Cola Cherry from Coca-Cola enterprises Sweden. In Norway, Coca-Cola Cherry is available at select stores.

Since January 2011, Coca-Cola Cherry is also available in Switzerland, where it is distributed by Coop. Since July 2013 Coca-Cola Cherry is available in Croatia, Romania and Spain. It returned to Canada by the 2013, 2014, and 2015 holiday season in cases of 24 cans at Costco stores for the two former, and general retail in the latter. It featured the same flavour and formula as the United States flavour, with a slightly edited, bilingual version of that country's can design. In 2014, it was featured as one of the last major attempts by Target Canada in Ontario to gain market share before announcing its closing in January of the following year. It has been mentioned by Target Canada itself that Cherry Coke was the number one requested grocery request by shoppers.

In late 2014, it was introduced in Uruguay (only in cans).

Coca-Cola Cherry returned to Canada once again in the summer of 2015 and 2016 as part of the "Share a Coke" campaign. Cherry Coke, in flats of 24 cans, have recently been available at Safeway, Sobeys, and Loblaws-owned stores across Canada with markings indicating production at the Brampton, Ontario bottling facility.

Coca-Cola Cherry returned to Brazil during the 2016 Summer Olympics. Originally available in certain markets in the country, availability of soft drink has expanded to other regions; while Cherry Coke has been relaunched, Vanilla Coke has also been launched.

Packaging and marketing
Packaging for Coca-Cola Cherry differs greatly from country to country. Coca-Cola has altered the logos and label designs in the U.S. for Coca-Cola Cherry several times since it was introduced in 1985. In most areas, the current can and bottle label designs are based on the standard Coca-Cola label in a pink or purple hue, often with images of cherries.

On February 7, 2007, Coca-Cola launched a new campaign for the Coca-Cola Cherry brand in the U.S., resulting in a significant redesign of the product's label. American rapper and record producer Jay-Z was chosen to be the spokesman and played a part in designing the new can graphics. A new diet version, Coca-Cola Cherry Zero, was also introduced. The original Diet Coke Cherry had still remained available in 12-packs up until 2018 when it was replaced with Diet Coke Feisty Cherry. These designs remained in place until early 2011, when a cleaner design (closer to the label designs used overseas) was introduced.

As part of Coca-Cola's ongoing "One Brand" marketing campaign, a new U.S. packaging design for Coca-Cola Cherry was introduced in January 2019. The new packaging follows the design principles already employed in the United States for Coca-Cola, Coca-Cola Zero Sugar, and Coca-Cola Life. The word "Coca-Cola" is superimposed upon a red disc with a picture of a cherry below the text. The background color of the can or bottle remains the same shade of purple introduced in the 2007 design. The word "Cherry" is placed above the red disc, similar to the "Original Taste" text currently used on cans and bottles of original Coca-Cola.

References

External links

 

Coca-Cola brands
Products introduced in 1985
Cherry colas